Cannon Township may refer to the following townships of the United States:

 Cannon Township, Michigan
 Cannon Township, Minnesota

See also 

 Cannon Beach, Oregon, USA
 Cannon City, Minnesota, USA
 Cannon County, Tennessee, USA
 Cannon Falls, Minnesota, USA
 Cannon Falls Township, Minnesota, USA